Emmanuelle 4: Concealed Fantasy is a 1994 television movie, which was the fourth episode from the erotic series Emmanuelle in Space. It was directed by Kevin Alber, and written by Thomas McKelvey Cleaver, based on character by Emmanuelle Arsan.

Haffron and Emmanuelle continue their erotic lessons, and partake in many global and sexual pleasures, while seeing the world. Both explore the advantages of different partners and the delight in pursuing one's wildest desires, but Haffron has trouble being monogamous, while becoming very jealous of men whom Emmanuelle finds attractive.

Principal cast
 Krista Allen as Emmanuelle
 Paul Michael Robinson as Haffron 
 Tiendra Demian as Tasha

Production crew
 Alain Siritzky - producer 
 John Lewis - composer 
 Andrea V. Rossotto - cinematographer
 Brett Hedlund - film editor

References

External links
 
 

American television films
1994 television films
1994 films
Emmanuelle in Space
American erotic films
1990s American films
1990s French films